The Native Trust and Land Act, 1936 (Act No. 18 of 1936; subsequently renamed the Bantu Trust and Land Act, 1936 and the Development Trust and Land Act, 1936) in South Africa passed a law that served as the reorganization of its agricultural structures. This followed the recommendations of the Beaumont Commission.

This ordinance stipulated that the reserve land, which the black population in the Natives Land Act, 1913 had been allocated of 7.13% (9,709,586 acres) to enlarge to  approximately 13.6% of the total area of the then South Africa. This value was not reached and remained so unfulfilled until the 1980s.(Reference 1) As late as 1972 the government purchased 1,146,451 acres to meet this requirement in the homelands.

In view of the fact that the black population accounted for at this time about 61% in the general population, this area ratio was very small. During the world economic depression damage occurring to agricultural land through erosion and overgrazing played a relevant role in the preparation of the Act. At the same time the rights of the black people were as tenant farmers restricted to white owners. From then on, blacks were only allowed to live on farms, which were owned by whites, and the black employees worked on them.

This selling pressure caused by the Act forced many blacks to seek work in salaried employment outside of their family and tribal tradition rooted in residential areas. Destinations of these migrations were the large farms of the whites and the cities, preferably industrial urban centers.

Repeal
The act was repealed by the Abolition of Racially Based Land Measures Act, 1991 on 30 June 1991.

See also
 :Category:Apartheid laws in South Africa
 Apartheid in South Africa
 Tomlinson Report (South Africa)

References

External links
 African History: Apartheid Legislation in South Africa
Brief description of the' Native Trust and Land Act 1936 No. 18

Apartheid laws in South Africa
1936 in South African law